St. Paul's Senior High School or St. Paul's Boys College , formerly St. Paul's Secondary, is a Ghanaian boys' senior high school located at Hatsukope-Denu in the Ketu South Municipal District of the Volta Region.

History and operations
Established in 1958, it is a Catholic school that is part of the Roman Catholic Diocese of Keta–Akatsi and has a minor seminary attached to it.

The school has the nickname SPACO derived from its name, however, the alumni (the old students' union) call themselves Conquerors after the school motto, ('Do good and conquer evil Vince In Bono Malum'). In the year 2000 the school was made a mixed school to promote girl child education in the Volta Region. After the first batch completed the school was turned again to boys school and has  till date remained a boys school.

Facilities 
 Boarding
 Hostel
 Science Lab
 I.T. Lab

Programmes offered 
 Business
 General arts
 General science
 Visual arts

See also

 Education in Ghana
 List of senior high schools in Ghana
 Roman Catholicism in Ghana

References

1958 establishments in Ghana
Boys' schools in Ghana
Educational institutions established in 1958
High schools in Ghana
Catholic secondary schools in Ghana
Education in Volta Region